Runaway June is an American country music group consisting of Stevie Woodward (lead vocals, guitar, piano, harmonica, autoharp), Jennifer Wayne (guitar, vocals), and Natalie Stovall (guitar, fiddle, banjo, mandolin, vocals). Wayne co-founded the group in 2015 with Hannah Mulholland (mandolin, vocals) and Naomi Cooke (lead vocals). Wayne was a former member of Stealing Angels and had co-written singles for other singers prior to the group's foundation. Signed to BBR Music Group's Wheelhouse imprint in 2015, the group charted two singles on the Billboard Hot Country Songs and Country Airplay charts prior to their breakthrough hit "Buy My Own Drinks" in 2018. This was the first of three singles from their 2019 studio album Blue Roses. Mulholland quit the group in 2020 and was replaced by Natalie Stovall, former lead singer of Natalie Stovall and the Drive; Cooke quit in 2022 and was replaced by Stevie Woodward.

Background
Jennifer Wayne, a granddaughter of John Wayne, grew up in southern California, and Hannah Mulholland grew up in Los Angeles, California, while Naomi Cooke is from Cedar Key, Florida. Cooke co-wrote Tyler Farr's top 40 hit "Better in Boots". Wayne was originally one-third of the group Stealing Angels, and co-wrote Eric Paslay's top 20 hit "She Don't Love You" and Keith Urban's 2021 hit "Wild Hearts". Under this lineup, Cooke was the lead vocalist, Mulholland was the low harmony vocalist and mandolin player, and Wayne the high harmony vocalist and guitar player.

The three met in Nashville and wrote their debut single "Lipstick" with assistance from Rebecca Lynn Howard, Caroline Hobby (also a former member of Stealing Angels), and Elisha Hoffman. The song was released in 2016 via Broken Bow Records' Wheelhouse Records imprint. An uncredited review from Taste of Country praised the "original premise" and vocal harmonies. They released their self-titled debut EP in September 2018, which featured the singles "Wild West" and "Buy My Own Drinks."

The group was a supporting act for Carrie Underwood on her Cry Pretty Tour 360, which ran from May 1, 2019, to October 31, 2019, alongside Maddie & Tae. On May 23, 2019, the group announced their debut album Blue Roses, which was released on June 28, 2019. "Buy My Own Drinks" which served as the lead-off single, is included on the album alongside three other songs from their previous EP release.  The album debuted at No. 36 on the Top Country Albums chart, and No. 2 on the Heatseekers Albums chart. After "Buy My Own Drinks", the band also charted two more singles from the album: "Head over Heels" and "We Were Rich".

On May 14, 2020, Mulholland announced that she was leaving the group. The next day, the other two members confirmed that she was replaced by Natalie Stovall, former lead singer of Natalie Stovall and the Drive, who also plays the fiddle for the group. This was followed in February 2022 by Naomi Cooke's departure from the band; she was replaced by Stevie Woodward two months later.

Personal lives
On January 9, 2021, Wayne married Austin Moody in a private ceremony. She first confirmed in November 2021 that she was pregnant with her first child.

Discography

Studio albums

EPs

Singles

Other charted songs

Music videos

Awards and nominations

Tours
Supporting
Cry Pretty Tour 360 (2019) supporting Carrie Underwood with Maddie & Tae
Proud to Be Right Here Tour (2020) supporting Luke Bryan

References

Country music groups from Tennessee
BBR Music Group artists
Musical groups established in 2015
Vocal trios
Musical groups from Nashville, Tennessee
2015 establishments in Tennessee
All-female bands